Raed Ahmed (born 5 June 1967) is a weightlifter. He represented Iraq at the 1996 Summer Olympics in Atlanta, where he was the flagbearer during the opening ceremony. Raed defected to the United States after his event was over.

Early life and career
Raed was born in Basra, Iraq. He attended college and has a degree. He lived in southern Iraq prior to the Olympics.

In 1984, Raed became the Iraqi champion of weightlifting in the 99kg weight class. Uday Hussein, Saddam Hussein's oldest son, was appointed the chairman of the Iraqi Olympic Committee the same year. Uday was known for torturing athletes after failure and Raed repeatedly attempted to lower his expectations, claiming with the help of physicians that he was injured. While he had considered defection at the 1995 World Weightlifting Championships, held in Guangzhou, China, he thought he would be forcibly repatriated if he attempted to do so.

1996 Olympics

As the flagbearer for Iraq at the opening ceremony in Atlanta, Raed was forbidden from looking at U.S. President Bill Clinton during the Parade of Nations on 19 July 1996. He disobeyed these orders, noticing that Clinton was clapping for the Iraqi delegation; this made him finalise his decision to defect. In his event, he finished in 23rd place, third from the bottom.

At the end of July, Raed fled from the Olympic Village, which was located at Georgia Tech, while his minders were preparing for a visit to Zoo Atlanta. He was the second member of an Olympic delegation to defect in a week. Prior to his escape, he had arranged to meet a student at the university who had facilitated his getaway. He was brought to Decatur and later met with agents from the Immigration and Naturalization Service to claim asylum.

In a subsequent press conference, Raed stated that he would be executed if he returned to Iraq, having been sentenced to death in absentia.
Raed was called a "candle burning for Iraq" by a Kuwaiti journalist recognizing his "act of sacrifice". He said that if the asylum application were approved, he would continue weightlifting and bring his wife to the United States.

Personal life
Raed's wife was evacuated from their house a day before his escape to a "haven in the Kurdish region of northern Iraq". Following his defection, his wife was ordered to divorce him, his mother was fired and family was detained by the government for two weeks and were ostracised upon their release. Raed's wife left Iraq in 1998 and he visited the country in 2004 for the first time since his defection, following the fall of Saddam's government. , he lives in Dearborn, Michigan, saying that "Dearborn is like Baghdad" due to the significant Iraqi population following the Iraq War. He has five children, having worked as a used car salesman and football and basketball coach.

Notes

References

1967 births
Living people
Weightlifters at the 1996 Summer Olympics
Iraqi male weightlifters
Olympic weightlifters of Iraq
Iraqi defectors
20th-century Iraqi people